Helicina aspersa is a species of a land snail, terrestrial gastropod mollusk in the family Helicinidae.

Distribution 
This species lives in Cuba.

Ecology 
Helicina aspersa is a tree dwelling species.

Predators of Helicina aspersa include larvae of firefly bug Alecton discoidalis. On some occasions, the Helicina aspersa emit a protective foam which enables them to thwart the attack.

References

External links

Helicinidae
Gastropods described in 1839
Endemic fauna of Cuba